Serra Talhada is a city in the state of Pernambuco, Brazil. It is located at 07º59'31" South and 38º17'54" West, at an altitude of 429 metres. As of 2020, its estimated population by IBGE was 86,915 people. Its area is approximately 2980 km sq.

History

It used to be known as "Villa Bella" or "Beautiful Village". The name Serra Talhada means Chopped Hill; the city has a big hill that looks as if it had been chopped in half. The inhabitants of Serra Talhada have a dance called xaxado which used to be a  dance performed by the Cangaceiros.

Geography

 State - Pernambuco
 Region - Sertão of Pernambuco
 Boundaries - Floresta  (S);   Calumbi, Betânia and Santa Cruz da Baixa Verde (E);  Mirandiba and São José do Belmonte (W); Paraiba  state(N)
 Area - 2980 km2
 Elevation - 429 m
 Hydrography - Pajeú River ¬¬)
 Vegetation - Caatinga hiperxerófila
 Climate - Hot semi-desertic
 Annual average temperature - 25.2 c
 Distance to Recife - 410.7 km

The municipality was designated a priority area for conservation and sustainable use when the Caatinga Ecological Corridor was created in 2006.

Sports

There are two main football clubs in Serra Talhada, Ferroviário Esporte Clube and Serrano Futebol Clube. These two teams are rivals, playing the Serra Talhada derby.

The city's football stadium is the Estádio Nildo Pereira de Menezes, usually known by its nickname Pereirão, and it has a maximum capacity of 5,000 people.

Economy

The main economic activities in Serra Talhada are general commerce and primary sector (employs 34%) especially corn and beans.

Economic Indicators

Economy by Sector
2006

Transportation
The city is served by Santa Magalhães Airport.

Health Indicators

See also
Serra Talhada (Portuguese Wikipedia)

References

External links
 Municipal website of Serra Talhada (in Portuguese)

Municipalities in Pernambuco